Mikhaēl III may refer to:

 Michael III (840–867), Byzantine Emperor
 Michael III of Anchialus, Patriarch of Constantinople in 1170–1177